Lindsey Greechan is an international lawn bowls player from Jersey. She became the British singles champion after winning the British Isles Bowls Championships in 2008.

Bowls career

Commonwealth Games
Lindsey Greechan represented Jersey in lawn bowls at the 2014 Commonwealth Games. With Katie Nixon, the pair lost to Northern Ireland in the pairs bronze medal match 15–14. Had they won the match, they would have been Jersey's first medalists at the Commonwealth Games for 24 years.

Other events
She became the first bowls player from Jersey to win an IIBC Championships at any level in 2002, when she won the Junior Ladies title. She helped Jersey defeat England in a test series for the first time in 2004.

At the Atlantic Bowls Championships in 2007, Lindsey won gold with Jersey in the women's fours event. In 2008, she came away with a bronze medal at the women's World Singles Champion of Champions event.

Lindsey has won Jersey's women's outdoor Bowler of the Year three times, in 2008, 2010, and 2012. Her mother, Gina Le Long, father, Peter Le Long, and brother, Kevin Le Long, have all played or play bowls competitively as well at national and international level for Jersey.

Family

Greechan is part of a successful bowls family that includes her husband Thomas and daughter Chloe.

References

Jersey bowls players
1981 births
Living people
Bowls players at the 2014 Commonwealth Games
Commonwealth Games competitors for Jersey